"Full Moon" is a song recorded by South Korean singer Sunmi, featuring rapper Lena, for her first EP Full Moon. Written and produced by Brave Brothers, the song was released on February 17, 2014, by JYP Entertainment as the lead single from the EP.

Background and release
The song marks JYP Entertainment and Brave Entertainment's first collaboration, as mentioned in the first verse of the song: "The first collaboration of JYP, and Brave Sound, here we come, Sunmi."

Critical reception
The Korea Herald said that the song "delivers a fresh sound, gladly moving away from the typical musical style found on many recent JYP releases. The groovy brass and guitar riffs alongside sensual drumbeats blend in well with Sunmi's husky vocals. The hypnotic repetition of the chorus, “eh eh eh,” is addictive and adds to the seductive mood of the song."

Music video
The music video, directed by Naive Creative Production, was released along with the song. As of July 2020, it has over 25.5 million views on YouTube.

Credits and personnel
Credits adapted from Discogs.

 Sunmi – vocals
 Lena — featured vocals
 Brave Brothers – songwriting, composing, producing, arrangement, all instruments, programming
 Elephant Kingdom — composing, arrangement, all instruments, programming
 Lee Jung-min — arrangement, keyboard
 Oh Young-joon — guitar
 Maboos — background vocals
 Hyun Seung-hee — background vocals
 Um Se-hee – recording
 Phil Tan — mixing
 Daniela Rivera — mixing
 Brian Gardner — mastering

Usage in media
Pearl and Garnet's fusion dance in the Steven Universe episode "Cry for Help" (which aired on July 13, 2015) was inspired by the choreography of "Full Moon" with storyboards timed to the song.

Charts

Weekly charts

Monthly charts

Year-end charts

Accolades

Awards and nominations

Music program awards

Release history

References

2014 songs
2014 singles
Sunmi songs
Korean-language songs
JYP Entertainment singles
Songs written by Brave Brothers